Theodore Balfour Waddington (born November 1943) is a British art dealer.

Early life and education
Theodore Balfour Waddington (born November 1943) is the son of Victor Waddington, and the younger brother of Leslie Waddington, both art dealers. Growing up, Theo and his brother played chess with Samuel Beckett when they were in Paris.

Career
At one time, he had five art galleries and at least 40 staff.

Personal life
Theo and his wife, Vivienne Waddington, were living in Ballycotton, County Cork, Ireland until at least 2012.

References

1943 births
Living people
British art dealers
Theo